The 2021 Marist Red Foxes football team represented Marist College in the 2021 NCAA Division I FCS football season as a member of the Pioneer Football League. They were led by 29th-year head coach Jim Parady and played their home games at Tenney Stadium at Leonidoff Field.

Schedule

References

Marist
Marist Red Foxes football seasons
Marist Red Foxes football